Çilov (also, Cilov, Jiloy) is a village on Chilov Island in the municipality of Çilov-Neft Daşları in the Əzizbəyov raion of Baku, Azerbaijan. The village name was changed from Jiloy to Çilov on 5 October 1999. it is the most eastern point of Europe.

References

Populated places in Baku